Fine press printing and publishing comprises historical and contemporary printers and publishers publishing books and other printed matter of exceptional intrinsic quality and artistic taste, including both commercial and private presses.

History of fine press

As part of the Arts and Crafts movement in the late 19th and early 20th centuries, the Englishman William Morris wanted to counter the industrialization of culture through a revival of craft in printing, printmaking, and publishing.  One of the books they published was the Kelmscott Chaucer.  Soon, fine presses began to spring up in the United States as well.  The most prominent was the Roycroft Press.  Los Angeles was a center of the fine press movement, particularly centered on the Ward Ritchie press. In the 1920s, San Francisco became known for the elegant publications of John Henry Nash, and likewise became a fine press center on the west coast.

List of fine presses

United States
 Alderbrink Press (1897 - 1928?)
 Blue Sky Press (1899–1906)
 Clerk's Press (1908–1919)
 Cranbrook Press (1900–1902)
 Elston Press (1900–1904)
 Marion Press (1896–1931)
 The Mosher Press (1891 - 1923+)  Set up by Thomas Bird Mosher in 1891, in Portland, Maine
 No Reply Press (2019-Present)
 Philosopher Press (1896–1904)
 Roycroft Press (1896 - 1915+)  Set up by Elbert Hubbard in 1895
 Trovillion Press at the Sign of the Silver Horse  Set up by Hal W. Trovillion in Herrin, Illinois in 1908
 Hammer Creek Press (1950–1962)
 Thornwillow Press, New York (1985 - Present)

California presses
 Colt Press, San Francisco
 Grabhorn Press, San Francisco
 John Henry Nash, San Francisco
 Plantin Press, Los Angeles.  Founded by Saul and Lillian Marks, in 1931
 Saunders Studio Press, Claremont.  Founded by Lynne and Ruth Thompson Saunders in 1927
 Ward Ritchie Press
 Arion Press, San Francisco

United Kingdom
 Ashendene Press (1894–1935)
 Daniel Press Oxford (1874–1903)
 Doves Press (1900–1916) - Founded by T. J. Cobden-Sanderson and Emery Walker
 Eragny Press (1894–1914)
 Essex House Press (1898–1910)
 Fine Press Poetry (founded 2013) by Andrew J Moorhouse
 Folio Society - Founded by Charles Ede in 1947
 Golden Cockerel Press - Founded by Harold Midgley Taylor in 1920
 Gregynog Press (1922-) - Founded by Gwendoline and Margaret Davies
 Kelmscott Press (1891–1898) - Set up by William Morris in 1891
 Kynoch Press (1876-1981) - English-based fine press in Witton, Birmingham, founded as a company press for Kynoch, a British ammunition manufacturer.
 Nonesuch Press - Founded in 1922 by Francis and Vera Meynell, and David Garnett
 The Press of Gaetano Polidori
 Rampant Lions Press (1924-2008)
 St James Park Press of James Freemantle (2014-Present)
 Strawberry Hill Press of Horace Walpole
 Vale Press (1896–1905)
 Vincent Press

Continental Europe
 Ad insigne pinus (1594–1619)  In Augsburg
 AIZ Dosije (1988-Present)  In Belgrade

Australia
 Finlay Press founded and operated by Phil Day (artist) and Ingeborg Hansen in Australia. 1997-2009.

See also

 Arts and Crafts movement
 Private press
 Small press

References

External links
 Fine Press Book Association (UK)
 Fine Press and Amateur Typecasting 
 List of Fine Presses  at LibraryThing

Printing
Publishing
Book collecting